Hypericum ellipticifolium is a flowering plant in the family Hypericaceae. It was formerly included in the genus Lianthus, which was described by Norman Robson in 2001. It is native to southern China.

References

ellipticifolium